Habit is a 1997 vampire horror film starring Larry Fessenden, who also wrote and directed the film.

Plot
Sam is a self-destructive, vaguely artistic New York bohemian who has recently lost his father and his long-time girlfriend. At a Halloween party he meets a mysterious, beautiful, androgynous woman named Anna (Meredith Snaider). He embarks on a kinky, sex-charged relationship with her; but soon he suffers from a mysterious illness, and eventually comes to believe that Anna is a vampire.

Awards

See also
Vampire film

References

External links

American supernatural horror films
1997 horror films
1997 films
Glass Eye Pix films
American vampire films
1990s English-language films
1990s American films